Wendy Boase (14 October 1944 – 15 March 1999) born in Melbourne, Australia, she was one of the co-founders of the children's publishing company Walker Books. She held the position of editorial director of Walker Books until her death in 1999 from cancer. After her death Julia Eccleshare (Children's Book Editor of the Guardian newspaper and chairman of the Nestlé Smarties Book Prize) and Anne Marley (Head of Children's, Youth & Schools Services for Hampshire Library & Information Service) decided to create an annual award named the Branford Boase Award in commemoration of both Wendy Boase and her colleague Henrietta Branford who also died of cancer the same year. Wendy Boase helped Henrietta Branford to write the novel Fire, Bed, and Bone which won the Guardian Children's Fiction Prize.

References

External links 
 Information on the beginnings of the Branford Boase Award
 Information on the Walker Books company history

1944 births
1999 deaths
Australian editors
Australian women editors
Australian people of Cornish descent